Běleč is the name of several locations in the Czech Republic:

Běleč (Brno-Country District), a municipality and village in the South Moravian Region
Běleč (Kladno District), a municipality and village in the Central Bohemian Region
Běleč (Tábor District), a municipality and village in the South Bohemian Region
Běleč nad Orlicí, a municipality and village in the Hradec Králové Region